The 2016 Pan American Individual Event Artistic Gymnastics Championships was held in Sucre, Bolivia, September 12–18, 2016. The competition was organized by the Bolivian Gymnastics Federation and approved by the International Gymnastics Federation.

Medal summary

Senior medalists

Junior medalists

Medal table

Seniors

Juniors

References

2016 in gymnastics
Pan American Gymnastics Championships
International gymnastics competitions hosted by Bolivia
History of Sucre